Nanochromis is a genus of small cichlids endemic to the Congo River Basin in Central Africa.

Species
The genus Congochromis was split from Nanochromis in 2007. The following species remain in Nanochromis:

 Nanochromis consortus T. R. Roberts & D. J. Stewart, 1976
 Nanochromis minor T. R. Roberts & D. J. Stewart, 1976
 Nanochromis nudiceps (Boulenger, 1899)
 Nanochromis parilus T. R. Roberts & D. J. Stewart, 1976
 Nanochromis splendens T. R. Roberts & D. J. Stewart, 1976
 Nanochromis teugelsi Lamboj & Schelly, 2006
 Nanochromis transvestitus T. R. Roberts & D. J. Stewart, 1984
 Nanochromis wickleri Schliewen & Stiassny, 2006

In addition, a couple of undescribed species are known.

References

 

Chromidotilapiini
Cichlid genera
Taxa named by Jacques Pellegrin